Debre Sina (Ge'ez ደብረ ሲና Dabra Sīnā, modern Debre Sīnā, "Mount Sinai") is the name of a number of places in Eritrea and Ethiopia.

Debre Sina (church), a church near Gorgora, on the northern shore of Lake Tana
Debre Sina (Eritrea), a monastery in Anseba Region, near Keren
Debre Sina (island), an island of Lake Zway
Debre Sina (woreda), a woreda in the Amhara Region
Debre Sina, Ethiopia, a town
Debre Sina Monastery (Ethiopia), a monastery in Gojjam province (modern day Amhara Region)